The Marine Corps Detachment at Fort Leonard Wood, Missouri hosts the largest United States Marine Corps detachment outside a Marine Corps base. With over 1200 students and support personnel, Ft Leonard Wood hosts Marines training at the Motor Transport Instruction School, Military Police Instruction School, Chemical Biological Radiological and Nuclear Defense School and the Engineer Equipment Instruction School.

See also

 List of United States Marine Corps installations

External links
 Official detachment website

Buildings and structures in Pulaski County, Missouri
United States Marine Corps bases